Josef Tomáš (born 12 March 1934) is a Czech long-distance runner. He competed in the men's 5000 metres at the 1964 Summer Olympics.

References

1934 births
Living people
Athletes (track and field) at the 1964 Summer Olympics
Czech male long-distance runners
Olympic athletes of Czechoslovakia